The Clube Ferroviário de Luanda aka Ferroportuária, sports club, among other sports, has a women's handball team competing at the local level, at the Luanda Provincial Handball Championship and at the Angola National Handball Championship. While the club has currently not been involved in any official competitions, Clube Ferroviário was the first Angolan Team handball Club to win an African champions cup title, having achieved such a feat in 1987.

Honours

Angolan League:
Winner (9): 1979, 1981, 1982, 1983, 1984, 1985, 1986, 1987, 1988
African Club Champions Cup:
Winner (1): 1987

Players

Chairman history
 1981–1985 Francisco de Almeida
 1985–1988 Feliciano Pedrosa
 1988–1995 António Agante
 1996–2005 Sílvio Vinhas
 2005–2012 Abel Cosme
 2013–2016 Bráulio de Brito
 2017–pres Jorge Abreu

See also
Ferroviário de Luanda Basketball
Federação Angolana de Andebol

References

Sports clubs in Angola
Angolan handball clubs